Gonodonta bidens is a species of fruit-piercing moth in the family Erebidae. It is found in North America.

The MONA or Hodges number for Gonodonta bidens is 8542.1.

Subspecies
These three subspecies belong to the species Gonodonta bidens:
 Gonodonta bidens bidens g
 Gonodonta bidens meridionalis Todd, 1959 c g
 Gonodonta bidens tenebrosa Todd, 1959 c g
Data sources: i = ITIS, c = Catalogue of Life, g = GBIF, b = Bugguide.net

References

Further reading

 
 
 

Calpinae
Articles created by Qbugbot
Moths described in 1832